Spiralinella incerta is a rather widely distributed species of sea snail, a marine gastropod mollusk in the family Pyramidellidae, the pyrams and their allies.

Taxonomy
Following Giannuzzi-Savelli et al. (2014) for generic allocation, but taking into account that Spiralinella is the valid generic name, not Partulida Schaufuss, 1869 (unavailable).

Distribution
This marine species occurs in the following locations:
 Angola
 Canary Islands
 Cape Verde
 European waters (ERMS scope)
 Greek Exclusive Economic Zone
 Mediterranean Sea
 Portuguese Exclusive Economic Zone
 Principe Archipelagos
 São Tomé
 South West Coast of Apulia
 Spanish Exclusive Economic Zone

References

External links
 To Encyclopedia of Life

Pyramidellidae
Gastropods described in 1916
Molluscs of the Atlantic Ocean
Molluscs of the Mediterranean Sea